Kensington is a Dutch rock band from Utrecht that was formed in 2005. The band has since released two EPs and five studio albums: Borders (2010), Vultures (2012), Rivals (2014), Control (2016) and Time (2019). The band consists of vocalist/guitarist Eloi Youssef, guitarist/vocalist Casper Starreveld, bassist Jan Haker and drummer Niles Vandenberg.

Biography

Early years (2005–2008) 
Kensington was formed in 2005 at a secondary school in Zeist, Jordan MLU, by singer/guitarist Casper Starreveld, bass player Jan Haker and drummer Lucas Lenselink. Singer/guitarist Eloi Youssef joined the band in 2006. Kensington's first official releases appeared in 2007 on Stuck in a Day Records: the two-song promo single An Introduction To... and the five-song Kensington EP. This self-produced EP was recorded in the Second Moon Studio of Dutch folk singer Hessel van der Kooij, on the island of Terschelling, and was mixed and mastered by Martijn Groeneveld in the Mailmen Studios in Utrecht.
The Kensington EP received good reviews, including from Dutch music platform MusicFromNL, which showered it with praise. "The band effortlessly combines different styles and moods into a comprehensive sound. (...) The quartet from Utrecht show musical sophistication on this debut. These five songs exhibit Kensington's prowess, originality and musicality. It is a well-produced, diverse and catchy record." The band played several shows in 2007 with Dutch touring showcase festival the Popronde, and as support for bands such as American indie rock band Movies With Heroes. They also appeared in TV shows on Dutch music channel TMF and in online and printed music magazines such as alternative pop platform 3VOOR12.

At the end of 2007, drummer Lucas Lenselink decided to leave the band. Lenselink felt that his own ambitions did not match those of his bandmates anymore. He explained that a career in music was not what he had envisioned for himself and that he wanted to focus on finishing his studies at university. After auditioning a couple of new drummers, Niles Vandenberg, former drummer of Griffin, joined Kensington in February 2008. Niles does share the ambitions of the rest of the band and is seen as "a great addition".

Together with Niles, the band started working on their second EP. The record, titled Youth, was released on 12 December 2008 on Dutch indie label Snowstar Records. Youth received positive reviews from MusicFromNL, amongst others, which praised the inventiveness of the song structures and the professional-sounding production.
Youth EP generated attention from several record labels and the band eventually signed with Bladehammer/EMI, a label that shares the band's high ambitions.

Dutch radio station 3FM included Kensington in its Serious Talent program, which aims to support local talent by providing airplay and by hosting shows around the country. In addition to this, Kensington were invited to be the support act for Razorlight, My Chemical Romance and The Wombats for their shows in the Netherlands.

Borders (2009–2011) 
In the summer of 2009, Kensington traveled to Leeds to start work on their first full-length album with producer James Kenosha, in the studio of Kaiser Chiefs' keyboardist Nick Baines. The album, titled Borders, came out on 17 July 2010. It was mastered by John Davis, who has worked with Arctic Monkeys as well. The first single, "Youth", received regular airplay on 3FM, MTV and TMF, and entered the Dutch Single Top 100 chart at number 78. The release of Borders also saw Eloi Youssef becoming the main vocalist of the band, where previously he had shared lead vocal duties with Casper Starreveld on the band's earlier releases. The latter chose to focus on playing guitar and singing backing vocals.
The band spent the rest of 2010 touring the Netherlands with pop punk band MakeBelieve and several supporting acts.

The second single to come off Borders, "When It All Falls Down", was released in November of that year.

In January 2011, Kensington performed on the showcase festival Eurosonic Noorderslag, where the band was noticed by promoters from Dutch prime time TV show De Wereld Draait Door. On 19 January, the band appeared on the show to play their single "Youth". In February the band set out on its first tour as main headliner, the No Borders Tour. The tour was a success, with sold-out shows in Paradiso Amsterdam, Tivoli Utrecht and Rotown Rotterdam.

Another eight shows were added when the single "Let Go" came out in March 2011. "Let Go" was a new song which hadn't been included on the initial release of Borders, but was added to an April 2011 re-release of the album in Digipak format. "Let Go" was chosen as 3FM's Megahit for the second week of April, which meant that the radio station gave the track extra airplay. For the "Let Go" tour, the band played venues such as 013 Tilburg and in the main hall of Paradiso Amsterdam as support for English pop group Scouting For Girls. Reviews for the shows were good and Kensington established itself as a solid live band.

In the summer of 2011, a great majority of Kink FM listeners voted for Kensington to become 'National Festival Ambassador of 2011'. This title included a slot on Serbia's EXIT Festival, one of the larger European summer festivals. The band was invited to play on Java Rockin'land in Indonesia as well. During their stay in Indonesia, they played two shows on the festival and one at the Erasmushuis, the Dutch cultural centre in Jakarta.

On 11 October 2011, Borders was released in the U.S. and Canada through Zip Records, an indie record label from San Francisco. The record also became available worldwide on iTunes. To celebrate the release of Borders in North America, the band released a video for "Let Go". Footage for the video was shot by young British director and editor Daniel Burnett during the band's stay in Indonesia and at several shows of the Let Go tour.

On 25 October 2011, the band released "We Are the Young", the first single off their upcoming second studio album. The song was recorded in producer Niels Zuiderhoek's YouGuysMusic studios in Berlin and mixed by Cenzo Townshend in London. Kensington spent the rest of 2011 working on their second album with Zuiderhoek in several recording sessions. In early November, they were invited to New York City, where they did some promotional work for Zip Records and played a show in the Cutting Room, a music venue in Manhattan. The band also did some radio interviews for college radio stations "The Atlantic Tunnel" and "East Village Radio", and appeared in Cognac Wellerlane's TV show The Long Island Exchange. In December, Kensington were back in the Netherlands for a couple of shows where they premiered songs from their new album.

Vultures (2012–2013) 
Kensington used the first months of 2012 to perfect their second album, Vultures. The band had planned a tour in February and March but postponed it until April, so as to be able to work on the songs some more and to give their fans the chance to listen to the album before the start of the tour. Eventually, it proved to be impossible to release the album before the start of the tour, but the band organized some dressing room listening sessions for a select group of fans, who got the chance to hear some of the album tracks before everyone else. The band took advantage of the all but sold 
-out shows in Effenaar Eindhoven, Hedon Zwolle, Tivoli Utrecht and Melkweg Amsterdam to test-run the new material.

6 April 2012 saw the release of the second single from Vultures, "Send Me Away", on Universal Music. The song got picked up by radio station 3FM straightaway, which put it on regular rotation.

The band received two nominations at the 2012 3FM Awards in the categories "Serious Talent Award", which is awarded by a jury, and "Best Artist Rock", which is based on fan votes.

Vultures was released on 11 May 2012. The album was co-produced by Kensington and Niels Zuiderhoek and mixed by Cenzo Townshend, famous for his work with bands such as Editors, Snow Patrol and U2. The album was mastered in New York by Steve Fallone at Sterling Sound. Dutch music magazine OOR called Vultures "the best Dutch album of 2012", and other media praised the international sound of the album.

On 10 July 2012 the band released a third single, "No Way Out", the video for which starred Hollywood actor Michael Koltes and Brazilian supermodel Ana Araújo. The video was filmed in London in June and produced by Juriaan and Boris Booij, Dutch film-makers stationed in London.

Kensington played several music festivals during the summer of 2012, such as the Indian Summer Festival. The band spent the remainder of the year touring the country in what was their biggest tour to date. The Vultures club tour had 18 dates, almost half of which sold out well in advance, including the hometown venue of Tivoli Utrecht.

On 20 November, the band announced that Vultures would be released in Germany, Belgium, Austria, Switzerland and South Korea. The international version was released on 11 January 2013 through Universal Music. It included a previously unreleased song titled "Home Again", which was featured in the Jack Wolfskin winter campaign commercial. The song became popular and was eventually also released as a single.
During the last show of the Vultures Tour in Tivoli Utrecht, the band filmed a video for "Home Again". It was directed and edited by Boris Booij.

Kensington kick-started the year 2013 with eleven shows at the Eurosonic Noorderslag Festival and a short 5-stop sold-out tour in the Netherlands in March and April. The band also played shows with Two Door Cinema Club and Dutch rock band Kane. They played several big festivals that summer, including Pinkpop and Zwarte Cross in the Netherlands, Sziget in Hungary, Stonerock in Germany and Openair Gampel in Switzerland.

Kensington later offered the song "It Doesn't Have to Hurt" as a free download on their Bandcamp site.

In 2014 the band made the soundtrack for the film Reckless (Dutch title: Bloedlink).

Control, Time and Unplugged (2016–present) 
On 28 October 2016, Kensington released their fourth album, Control (after Rivals, which came out in 2014).

The lead single from the album, "Do I Ever", came out on 1 September 2016. A music video for the song was later released as well.

On 1 November 2016, the band released the second single, "Sorry", with the music video following later the same day.

On 10 March 2017, the band released the third single, "Bridges", with the music video coming out on the same day.

On 15 November 2019, Kensington released their fifth studio album, titled Time. The lead single off the album, "Bats", came out in May, followed by "What Lies Ahead" in August.

On 12 November 2021 the band announced that their lead singer, Eloi Youssef, would leave the band in 2022 due to creative differences. They performed together for the last place in September 2022.

On 26 November 2021, Kensington released the live album Unplugged (Live).

Band members 

Current
 Eloi Youssef – lead vocals, guitar, keys 
 Casper Starreveld – guitar, vocals, keys , lead vocals 
 Jan Haker – bass guitar, keys, backing vocals 
 Niles Vandenberg – drums 

Former
 Lucas Lenselink – drums 

Timeline

Discography

Studio albums

Compilation albums

Live albums 
 Unplugged (Live) (2021)

EPs 
 An Introduction To... (nl) (2006)
 Kensington (nl) (2007)
 Youth (nl) (2008)

Singles

Other charted songs

References

External links 
 
 

Dutch indie rock groups
English-language singers from the Netherlands